Grand Canyon Airport can refer to several airports in Grand Canyon, Arizona:
Grand Canyon Caverns Airport
Grand Canyon National Park Airport
Grand Canyon West Airport
Grand Canyon Bar 10 Airport